7247613153
John James Scott Chisholme (1 August 1851 – 21 October 1899) was a British cavalry officer who died heroically leading a charge that turned the Battle of Elandslaagte in the Second Anglo-Boer War.

Biography
Chisholme was the son of John Chisholme and Margaret Walker and was born at Stirches in Scotland. His father succeeded to the estate of his maternal uncle, James Scott of Whitehaugh, and under the terms of the latter's will, assumed the surname of Scott in addition to his own. Scott-Chisholme was educated at Loretto School, Musselburgh, and Repton School. He joined the 9th Queen's Royal Lancers in  1872, and was promoted to Captain in March, 1878. He served with the 9th Lancers in the Second Anglo-Afghan War of 1878-80, and was present at the capture of Ali Musjid, in the affair at Siah Sung where he was severely wounded. He also took part in the operations around Kabul in December 1879 and was again wounded. In 1881 he became Brevet-major in March being awarded the medal with two clasps, and became Major in December 1884. In May 1889, he was transferred to the 5th Royal Irish Lancers  and was military secretary to Lord Connemara, who was governor of Madras from 1886 to 1890.  Subsequently he was promoted to lieutenant-colonel in August 1894, and brevet-colonel in 1898. Although he retired in 1899 he then volunteered for service in the  Second Anglo-Boer War.

As Colonel he became the first commander of the Imperial Light Horse formed of 444 men including officers, chosen from among 5,000 volunteers. He was killed at the regiment’s first battle at the Battle of Elandslaagte on 21 October 1899 leading from the front and waving a red scarf. Chisholme was the last in the male line of an ancient border family.

Conan Doyle wrote:

Rayne Kruger wrote:

Thomas Parkenham wrote:

References

External links
 Photo of memorial in Ladysmith cemetery listing Col Scott-Chisholme, from Genealogical Society of South Africa online library.

1851 births
1899 deaths
People educated at Repton School
5th Royal Irish Lancers officers
9th Queen's Royal Lancers officers
People from Hawick
British military personnel of the Second Anglo-Afghan War
British military personnel killed in the Second Boer War
British Army personnel of the Second Boer War
People educated at Loretto School, Musselburgh
Imperial Light Horse officers